The Granada Bridge, on U.S. Route 385 (US 385) at milepost 97.32 in or near Granada, Colorado. It was listed on the National Register of Historic Places in 2002.

It is a steel stringer bridge. The contract was let by Colorado Department of Highways in 1949 to replace an older bridge at the same location. The builder was the C.L. Hubner Company, with subcontractor Burkhardt Steel fabricating the steel superstructure.

References

Bridges in Colorado
National Register of Historic Places in Prowers County, Colorado
Bridges of the United States Numbered Highway System